"The Tomato Thief" is a 2016 fantasy novelette by Ursula Vernon. It was first published in Apex Magazine and has been reprinted in the collection Jackalope Wives and Other Stories.

Synopsis

When Grandma Harken (protagonist of "Jackalope Wives") stays up late to catch whoever is stealing fresh tomatoes from her garden, she finds herself drawn into a complex magical plot involving shapechangers, space warps, and gods.

Reception
"The Tomato Thief" won the 2017 Hugo Award for Best Novelette (for works of 7,500 to 17,500 words). Tor.com called it "excellent", noting that the story is a rare example of "older women as the protagonists of their own stories", and comparing Grandma Harken to Granny Weatherwax. Tangent Online considered it to be "hard to put back down".

References

External links
Text of the story

Hugo Award for Best Novelette winning works
Works by Ursula Vernon